Puerto Padre is a municipality and town in the Las Tunas Province of Cuba. It is located on the northern coastal region of the province, in an estuary (Estero El Españolito) that opens into the Puerto Padre Bay.

History
Known popularly as the City of Mills, Puerto Padre has a history dating back into the 16th century. In the mid-19th century (1851), the city began its transformation from a small town into an industrial centre with the construction of its first sugarcane mill. The town played a large role in Cuba's wars of independence, and today is something of a tourist centre. The founders were Criollo (Creole) landowners of Castilian ancestry and Catalan merchants.

Columbus' arrival point theory
During the 2nd half of the 20th century a group of archaeologists brought forward a theory which disputes the current version of Columbus' landfall site. They claim that Puerto Padre bay was indeed the first spot in which Columbus landed in Cuba. The commonly accepted site is Bariay bay which is located further east in the province of Holguín. There are several sites which are disputed of being the first landing spot of Columbus and his crew: Puerto Padre and Manatí, both in the province of Las Tunas; and Gibara and Bariay in the province of Holguín).

Geography

Overview
The city is located at the bottom corner of the bay which bears the same name. At least two rivers lead into Puerto Padre Bay. The small islet of Cayo Juan Claro is located towards the eastern center side of the bay, the Puerto Carupano port is located in this islet which is connected to the mainland by a man-made road, a railroad connects the islet with the now defunct sugar factory in the nearby town of Delicias. The terrain is mainly formed of flat-land although the city itself seats on a small hill which rolls nicely into the sea. The immediate terrain nearby the town is swampy with a thick mangrove forest.

Prior to the 1959 revolution, the municipality was divided into the barrios of Chaparra, Delicias, Estrada Palma, La Lima, La Yaya, Los Alfonsos, Maniabón, Norte, San Manuel, Santa María, Sur, Vázquez, Vedado and Yarey. These toponyms are still in use today though the pre-1959 municipality's borders no longer include Delicias (Antonio Guiteras) or Chaparra (Jesús Menéndez), named for their respective sugar mills, which as of 2012 are no longer operational.

Climate
This area typically has a pronounced dry season. According to the Köppen Climate Classification system, Puerto Padre has a tropical savanna climate, abbreviated "Aw" on climate maps.

Demographics
In 2004, the municipality of Puerto Padre had a population of 93,705.

Tourism
The town is known for its charming streets, bay views and hilltop fortress. Crystal clear water and white sandy beaches can be found at the entrance to the Puerto Padre Bay. These beaches are popular with locals and visitors alike, their names are: El Rail, La Boca and La Llanita. Tourist facilities are available at nearby beach resort located in Covarrubias beach, which is within the municipality of Puerto Padre.

Monuments and buildings of interest
 Castillo de Salcedo or Fuerte de la Loma: A hilltop fortress (ca.1869-1879). National Monument since 1981.
 Parroquia S. José (Roman Catholic church 1892 )
 Iglesia de Los Amigos (Quaker church ca. 1903)
 El Liceo, present site of the city's museum, built in 1929
 Parque José Martí (commonly called "de los Vagos" and "La Piquera" )
 Parque Antonio Maceo (formerly Independencia)
 Municipal Cemetery, which contains mausoleums and sculptures
 Estatua de la Libertad. Statue dedicated to Liberty (1904)
 Busto de las Madres. A monument dedicated to all mothers. (1946)
 Estatua de Máximo Gómez. A bronze statue dedicated to a general of the Independence War. (1959)
 Mural sculpture "Canto a la Revolución" by Mexican sculptor Electa Arenal Huerta, carved on the façade of the pediatric hospital in 1962
 Sculpture group of Don Quixote and the Wind Mill (1989)

Personalities
Teófilo Stevenson (1952 - 2012), Olympic gold medalist boxer
Efigenio Ameijeiras (1931 - 2020), Cuban revolutionary
Yoyo Díaz (1905 - 1989), baseball player
Enrique Peña Sánchez (1880 - 1922), musician
Francisco (Paco) Cabrera Pupo (1924 - 1959), Cuban revolutionary
Juan Pablo Torres Morell (1946 - 2005), Latin-Jazz Trombonist and composer
Emiliano Salvador Jr. (1951 - 1992), Latin-Jazz pianist and composer
José Chacón Bermudez (1889 - 1974), Poet and Journalist, author of Rosas y Laureles, the first book which was published and printed in the city in 1915
Juan Carlos Perez Rondon (b.1969), Olympic gold medalist baseball player

See also
Municipalities of Cuba
List of cities in Cuba

References

External links

 
Cities in Cuba
Populated places in Las Tunas Province
Port cities and towns in Cuba
Populated places established in 1541
1541 establishments in New Spain
1540s establishments in the Spanish West Indies
1540s in Cuba